Andrew Lanham is an American film screenwriter best known for his collaborations with Destin Daniel Cretton, including The Shack (2017), The Glass Castle (2017), Just Mercy (2019), and Shang-Chi and the Legend of the Ten Rings (2021).

Career 
In 2015, he began his career with a script for the drama film Boy21. In 2016, Lanham started a series of collaborations with Destin Daniel Cretton, by co-writing screenplay for the religious film The Shack. A second collaborative effort was developed in the same year with the drama film The Glass Castle. In 2017, he drafted the screenplay for the western film The Kid. In 2019, he wrote the script for Cretton's drama film Just Mercy. In 2021, he gained notability when he wrote the superhero film Shang-Chi and the Legend of the Ten Rings. In February 2022, he was writing the screenplay for Harbinger, based on the Valiant Comics comic book series of the same name.

Filmography

Accolades 
In February 2020, Lanham's work on Just Mercy was nominated at the NAACP Image Awards for Outstanding Writing in a Motion Picture. In September 2022, Lanham work on Shang-Chi and the Legend of the Ten Rings was nominated at the Hugo Awards for Best Dramatic Presentation, Long Form.

References

External links 
 

21st-century American male writers
21st-century American screenwriters
American male screenwriters
Living people
Place of birth missing (living people)
Year of birth missing (living people)